The 1978 Colorado Buffaloes football team represented the University of Colorado in the Big Eight Conference during the 1978 NCAA Division I-A football season.

Colorado again won its first five games, all at home, but then lost five of six and Mallory was fired on November 21 by athletic director Eddie Crowder, the previous head coach. Mallory was succeeded by Chuck Fairbanks, the head coach of the New England Patriots in the NFL for six years and formerly at conference foe Oklahoma (1967–72).

CU's next winning season was seven years away.

Schedule

References

External links
 University of Colorado Athletics – 1978 football roster
 Sports-Reference – 1978 Colorado Buffaloes

Colorado
Colorado Buffaloes football seasons
Colorado Buffaloes football